The term history of the Virgin Islands could refer to:
 the history of the British Virgin Islands
 the history of the U.S. Virgin Islands